Guiyu is a town created from an agglomerate of four adjoined villages totalling 150,000 people in the Chaoyang district of Guangdong province in China.  Situated on the South China Sea coast, Guiyu is perhaps best known in the global environmentalist community for its reception of e-waste. In fact, the town also holds the record for being the largest e-waste site of the world, as of 2013.

Electronic waste

Guiyu was once the largest e-waste site on earth, Regions like Guiyu rely on primitive electronics recycling as an economic staple despite the adverse effects electronic waste has on health and the environment.
The burning off of plastics in the town has resulted in 80% of its children having dangerous levels of lead in their blood.

A recent study of the area evaluated the extent of heavy metal contamination from the site. Using dust samples, scientists analysed mean heavy metal concentrations in a Guiyu workshop and found that lead and copper were 371 and 115 times higher, respectively, compared to areas located 30 kilometres away. The same study revealed that sediment from the nearby Lianjiang River was found to be contaminated by polychlorinated biphenyls at a level three times greater than the guideline amount.

Since 2013, local authorities moved most e-waste workshops into an experimental industrial ecology park called the National Circular Economy Pilot Industry Park. There, toxic waste by products can be better treated and recycled. Air and water quality subsequently improved in the town, though many were still left contaminated from the remnants of e-waste processing and have not been cleaned up.

In 2005 the Italian band Planet Funk shot and published the music video for their song "Stop Me" in which Guiyu and its e-waste environment are portrayed.

See also
Agbogbloshie (electronic waste site in Ghana)
Dali Town, Foshan another E-waste processing town in China.
Longtang Town, Qingcheng District, Qingyuan another E-waste processing town in China.

References

External links
Images of e-waste

Shantou